Thomas White aka  Cthulhu is a British former Tor hidden service developer and administrator.

Activities involved being consulted on a number of Tor security matters such as dark web scams, law enforcement raids and darknet markets.

He has hosted a number of data dumps including those associated with Hacking Team, Ashley Madison, and Patreon.

In January 2016 he hosted a release of the files hacked from the Fraternal Order of Police.

Arrest & Silk Road 2.0 
In November 2014, White was arrested as the mastermind behind Silk Road 2. In April 2019, White pleaded guilty to charges including drug trafficking, money laundering, as well as making indecent images of children, and was sentenced to a total of 5 years and 4 months in prison.

Career (other activities) 
He had claimed to have worked in a security vetted/cleared role at Enhanced Developed Vetting (eDV) level from August 2013 to December 2016 on his LinkedIn profile.

External links 
 Personal site
 Old Personal site

References 

Living people
British computer specialists
People associated with computer security
Dark web
Tor (anonymity network)
Year of birth missing (living people)
Place of birth missing (living people)